The 1966 New York state election was held on November 8, 1966, to elect the governor, the lieutenant governor, the state comptroller, the attorney general and the Chief Judge of the New York Court of Appeals, as well as all members of the New York State Assembly and the New York State Senate. Besides, 15 delegates-at-large to the New York State Constitutional Convention of 1967 were elected on the state ticket, and three delegates each in the 57 senatorial districts.

Background
Chief Judge Charles S. Desmond would reach the constitutional age limit of 70 years at the end of the year.

In 1965, the New York State Assembly districts had been re-apportioned to 165 numbered districts. This was ruled to be unconstitutional in 1966, and the number was reduced to 150 for this election.

Nominations
The Socialist Labor state convention met on April 3, and nominated Milton Herder, owner of a Manhattan advertising agency, for governor; Doris Ballantyne 2d, a bookkeeper in the party's national office, for lieutenant governor; and John Emanuel for comptroller.

The Socialist Workers Party met on July 24, and nominated Judith White, a "28-year-old brunette," for governor; Richard Garza for lieutenant governor; Ralph Levitt for comptroller; and taxi driver Paul Boutelle for attorney general. They filed a petition to nominate candidates in September. If the age was given correctly, Judith White was actually ineligible for the office; since 1822, the state Constitution requires a minimum age of thirty years to be elected governor.

The Conservative state convention met on September 7 at Saratoga Springs, New York, and nominated Prof. Paul L. Adams, an enrolled Republican, for governor; Kieran O'Doherty for lieutenant governor; Benjamin R. Crosby, of Riverdale, for comptroller; and Mason L. Hampton, Jr., for attorney general; and endorsed the Republican senior associate judge Stanley H. Fuld for chief judge.

The Democratic state convention met on September 7 at Buffalo, New York, and nominated New York City Council President Frank O'Connor for governor on the first ballot. Howard J. Samuels was the only other contender. The convention met again on September 8, and nominated Samuels for lieutenant governor, revolting against the party bosses who had selected Orin Lehman. They completed the ticket with Mayor of Buffalo, New York Frank A. Sedita for attorney general; re-nominated the incumbent Comptroller Levitt; and endorsed the Republican senior associate judge Stanley H. Fuld for chief judge.

The Republican state convention met on September 8 at Rochester, New York, and renominated the incumbents Rockefeller, Wilson and Lefkowitz; and completed the ticket with Oneida County Executive Charles T. Lanigan for comptroller; and senior associate judge Stanley H. Fuld for chief judge.

The Liberal state convention met on September 8, and nominated Franklin D. Roosevelt, Jr., for governor on the first ballot, polling 209 out of 312 votes. They also nominated the Rev. Donald S. Harrington for lieutenant governor;  for attorney general; and endorsed the Democratic incumbent comptroller Levitt for re-election and the Republican senior associate judge Stanley H. Fuld for chief judge.

Result
Almost the whole Republican ticket was elected, and only the Democratic comptroller Levitt managed to stay in office with the help of the Liberals.

The incumbents Rockefeller, Wilson, Levitt and Lefkowitz were re-elected.

Note: The vote for governor is used to define ballot access; for automatic access are necessary 50,000 votes.

Delegates to the Constitutional Convention
The delegates-at-large were elected on party lists; the candidates' names did not appear on the ballot.

99 Democrats, 82 Republicans, three Liberals and two Conservatives were declared elected to the New York State Constitutional Convention of 1967; among them 10 Democrats, three Liberals (Harrington, Dubinsky, Rose) and two Republicans at-large. One Democratic seat in the 33rd District (The Bronx) was contested in the courts, and the New York Court of Appeals declared it a tie, ordering a special election which was won by a Republican. Thus the Convention had a Democratic/Liberal majority of 101 against 85 Republicans and Conservatives.  The new state constitution proposed by this body was ultimately rejected by the voters at the subsequent election.

Notes

Sources
Official result: DEMOCRATS GAIN CONVENTION RULE IN STATE CANVASS; Conservatives Obtain Third Line on the Ballot When They Outpoll Liberals; Court Fight Is Possible on Democrats' 102-84 Edge in Constitutional Parley; Challenge Still Possible; Police Board a Factor; Record Governorship Vote in NYT on December 16, 1966 (subscription required)
Charter Revision in the Empire State - The Politics of New York's 1967 Constitutional Convention by Henrik N. Dullea (The Rockefeller Institute Press)
New York Red Book 1967

See also
New York gubernatorial elections
New York state elections

1966
 
New York